Stop! is a song written by Mikaela Stenström och Dimitri Stassos, and performed by Sibel Redžep at Melodifestivalen 2010. The song participated in the semifinal inside the Malmö Arena, but didn't make it further. It as also released as a single the same year. and peaked at 27th position at the Swedish singles chart.

Chart positions

References 

2010 singles
Sibel Redžep songs
Melodifestivalen songs of 2010
Songs written by Dimitri Stassos
2010 songs